The National Square Dance Campers Association (NSDCA) is a non-profit organization, with well over 100 chapters spanning the continental United States and Canada.

Early history
The NSDCA formed in 1964 after several successful meetings between square dance callers, and campers.  A separate organization, the Wolf River Area Callers' Association (WRACA), began workshops for square dance callers during the weekends, while smaller square dancing groups held weekend gatherings at inexpensive camp grounds.  Through word of mouth, campers heard about the WRACA's weekend workshops, which welcomed visitors.  Starting in 1958, the WRACA held a successful combined camporee annually in Shawano Lake, Wisconsin, for three years.

In 1961, the WRACA approved a motion to sample pins, which would culminate in a badge design by the end of the year.  The design was registered in Wisconsin, and to this day, is still used in NSDCA camporees.  The badges also consist of connected bars inscribed with the year and location of an international camporee, used to denote which camporees a member has attended.

Membership
In order for one to become a member of the NSDCA, they have to have completed a prescribed course in the Modern Western Square Dancing style.  They are also expected to camp in a recreational shelter, such as a tent, motorhome, or trailer.  Once inducted as a member, they are given a membership card, and assigned to a chapter closest to their proximity.

Children are admitted without having to complete a square dancing course, but by the age of 18, they must complete a course themselves, if they haven't already, to maintain their membership.

International Camporees
In addition to an individual chapter's monthly camporee, an annual combined camporee between every chapter in the NSDCA is held in the summertime, often in rural areas.  Activities during the week span from arts and crafts, to competitive games like horseshoe tossing and ring tossing, and programs for the youth.  Square dancing parties are held on a nightly basis, and the daily newsletter is sent out during the day for the full week, along with door prizes randomly given to members.

The next international camporee will be held in Huntingdon, Pennsylvania in 2011.

External links
 The National Square Dance Campers Association website